The Team technical routine competition at the 2019 World Aquatics Championships was held on 14 and 16 July 2019.

Results
The preliminary round was started on 14 July at 11:00. The final was held on 16 July at 19:00.

Green denotes finalists

References

Team technical routine